The Butterfly Murders   is a 1979 Hong Kong wuxia film directed by Tsui Hark. It has elements of history and a murder mystery. The film is not widely available on tape or DVD in the West (there is a German and a French DVD release), though there was a Hong Kong release.

Plot
Butterflies have apparently become a lethal weapon. Several rivals contend for a mysterious prize, using a variety of unusual weapons.

Cast
Lau Siu-ming as Scholar Fong
Michelle Yim as Green Shadow
Jojo Chan as Madam Shum
Chang Kuo-chu as Master Shum (he wears black knight armor that conceals his identity.)
 as Tien Lung clan leader
Ha Kwong-li as No. 10, Red Flag squad leader
Tsui Siu-ling as Chee
Eddy Ko as Kwok Lik
Tino Wong as Li Kim
Danny Chow as No. 3, White Flag squad leader
Lau Jun-fai as Mr Tsui

References

External links

The Butterfly Murders on Hong Kong Cinemagic

1979 films
Hong Kong New Wave films
Wuxia films
Films directed by Tsui Hark
Hong Kong martial arts films
1979 directorial debut films
1970s Hong Kong films